Walter Hineman Simmons, Sr. (July 26, 1879 – ?) was a college football player and surgeon.

Early years
Walter H. Simmons was born in Carrollton, Mississippi in July 1879, the son of Harry Simmons and Delia Johnston.

Vanderbilt University
Simmons completed a literary course at Vanderbilt University as a member of the class of 1901. He then pursued a medical degree as the class of 1903.

Football
He was a prominent end for the Vanderbilt Commodores football team.

1899
Simmons was captain of the 1899 team, selected All-Southern by Sewanee coach Billy Suter.

Basketball

1900–01
He was also a member of the 1900–01 basketball team, the school's first official squad.

Surgeon
After college, he moved to Arkansas and practiced there in various cities.

References

1879 births
American surgeons
Vanderbilt Commodores football players
Vanderbilt Commodores men's basketball players
American football ends
All-Southern college football players
19th-century players of American football
Players of American football from Mississippi
Sportspeople from Pine Bluff, Arkansas
Year of death missing
People from Carrollton, Mississippi
American men's basketball players